Byala reka (meaning White river) is a river in the Rhodope Mountains in Southern Bulgaria, the longest tributary of Luda reka.

The river rises near the village of Chernichevo, close to the Greek border then flows in a general eastern direction until it flows into Luda reka near Siv Kladenets exactly on the Greek border.

The river is notable for the meanders in its middle course which is part of the protected area "Meanders of the White river" as well the  species of ray-finned fish, Cobitis rhodopensis, which was discovered in 1998 and is the only endemic vertebrate in Bulgaria.

References 

Rivers of Bulgaria
Landforms of Kardzhali Province
Landforms of Haskovo Province